Greg Mansell (born 8 November 1987) is a British racing driver and road cyclist, currently racing in cycling's Halfords Tour Series, having previously competed in motorsports Formula Renault 3.5 Series. He is the son of 1992 Formula One world champion and 1993 PPG Indy Car World Series champion, Nigel Mansell, and younger brother of fellow racing driver Leo Mansell.

Motorsports

Greg and his older brother raced in the same series until 2009, starting with Karting in 2005. The brothers moved into single-seater racing in 2006, in the Formula BMW UK series.

In Formula BMW, the brothers disappointed, however, with Greg managing just 24 points, and Leo not managing any, while champion Niall Breen amassed 305.

Despite this, the pair were granted drives in the finale of the 2006 British Formula Three Championship at Thruxton, driving for the Fortec Motorsport team, in Invitational Class, with Greg finishing in a promising 8th position with the 2nd fastest time in the first race, with engine over heating he struggled to 18th in the second race.

Greg finished 3rd and on the podium for the first time in 2007 at Donington Park in the 3rd British Formula Three round, and had 2 more podiums after that with 16 top ten finishes.

For 2008 Greg and Leo Mansell moved to the American Atlantics, both driving for Walker Racing. The following year, Greg returned to Europe to compete in the 2009 Formula Renault 3.5 Series season, racing for both Ultimate Motorsport and Comtec Racing, finishing 26th in the championship. He will continue with Comtec into the 2010 season, partnering Stefano Coletti.

In addition to competing in the Formula Renault 3.5 series in 2010, he also co-drove a Ginetta-Zytek GZ09S – with his brother Leo and father Nigel – in select Le Mans Series events and in the 24 Hours of Le Mans. At the 8 Hours of Castellet they finished 9th overall (8th in LMP1), but their Le Mans effort was cut short due to a tyre failure and crash by Nigel early in the event. 
But the comeback was set and the brothers won their first race back in the car at Hungary 1000 km finishing 1st in LMP1.

Cycling

Having competed in swimming since 2006, Mansell started competing in cycling at the start of the 2011 season, taking his first ever win at the Mountbatten Circuit Race in Swinemouth earlier that year. He competed in the 2011 Halfords Tour Series for Team UK Youth. He finished 11th in the Men's Omnium at the 2012 British National Track Cycling Championships and 8th in the same event in 2013.

He won an individual bronze representing Jersey in the Town centre criterium at the 2013 Island Games. He was also a member of the bronze winning Jersey team in Men's Team Road Race and Men's Time Trial Team Award.

For the 2014 season he will be cycling for NFTO Pro Cycling, alongside former UK Youth riders Jon Mould and Josh Hunt.

Motorsport Racing record

American open–wheel racing results
(key) (Races in bold indicate pole position) (Races in italics indicate fastest lap)

Atlantic Championship

Complete Formula Renault 3.5 Series results
(key) (Races in bold indicate pole position) (Races in italics indicate fastest lap)

Complete 24 Hours of Le Mans results

References

https://web.archive.org/web/20140805113825/http://www.nftopro.com/DEV01/

External links

Q&A session with Leo and Greg

Mansell family
1987 births
Living people
Manx motorsport people
English racing drivers
British male cyclists
British Formula Three Championship drivers
Atlantic Championship drivers
Formula BMW UK drivers
European Le Mans Series drivers
World Series Formula V8 3.5 drivers
Blancpain Endurance Series drivers
24 Hours of Le Mans drivers
24 Hours of Spa drivers
Comtec Racing drivers
Walker Racing drivers
Fortec Motorsport drivers